Federica Apollonio (born November 1, 1991 in Pieve di Cadore, Belluno, Veneto, Italy) is an Italian curler.

At the national level, she is a five-time Italian women's champion (2011, 2012, 2015, 2016, 2017) and a 2013 Italian mixed champion.

Teams

Women's

Mixed

Mixed doubles

References

External links
 (why "Federica Ghedina" on CurlingZone??)

Federica Apollonio – OA Sport
Video: 

Living people
1991 births
Sportspeople from the Province of Belluno
Italian female curlers
Italian curling champions